The Transport (London) Act 1969 (1969 c. 35) was an Act of the United Kingdom Parliament which abolished the London Transport Board. Its main functions were transferred to a new London Transport Executive under the auspices of the Greater London Council. The Country Bus and Coach Department was separated as London Country Bus Services, a subsidiary of the National Bus Company.

See also
Transport Act 1968

References

United Kingdom Acts of Parliament 1969
Railway Acts
Acts of the Parliament of the United Kingdom concerning London
1969 in London
1969 in transport
Transport policy in the United Kingdom
Transport legislation
History of transport in the United Kingdom